Luohu Foreign Languages School, or LFLS, is a First-Class School of Guangdong Province located in Liantang Sub-district, Luohu District, Shenzhen City, Guangdong Province. It is both a high school and a junior middle school.

History
 On 24 April 1999, the People's Government of Luohu District built Luohu Foreign Languages School at the original address of the Shenzhen School of Technology.
 In May 2005 LFLS became a First-Class School of Luohu District.
 In April 2003 LFLS became a First-Class School of Shenzhen City.
 In April 2004 LFLS became a First-Class School of Guangdong Province.
 In September 2007 Liantang Middle School Campus came into service as the junior section of LFLS.

Campus
LFLS has two campuses:
 Headquarters: Senior section, located at Xianhu Road.
 Liantang Middle School Campus: Junior section, located at Guowei Road.

Principal
1999～2006: Chen Han'gang
2006～2013 Yuan Liangping
2013～now Ning Ge

Campus activity
 Xmas garden party
 "Super Star" Campus Singer Contest
 Campus sports meeting
 Reading Month

References

External links
Official website of Luohu Foreign Languages School
Official website of Luohu Foreign Languages School (Junior Section)

High schools in Shenzhen
Educational institutions established in 1999
Schools in China
1999 establishments in China